The 2002 World Weightlifting Championships were held in Warsaw, Poland from 19 November to 26 November. The men's +105 kilograms division was staged on 26 November 2002.

Schedule

Medalists

Records

Results

New records

References
Weightlifting World Championships Seniors Statistics, Page 42 
Results 

2002 World Weightlifting Championships